Jebensfjellet is a mountain in Sabine Land at Spitsbergen, Svalbard. The mountain has a height of 607 m.a.s.l., and is surrounded by the glaciers of Hayesbreen, Luitpoldbreen and Königsbergbreen. It is named after businessperson Johann Heinrich Theodor Jebens.

References

Mountains of Spitsbergen